The Best FIFA Football Awards 2018 were held on 24 September 2018 in London, United Kingdom. The selection panels were announced on 4 July 2018.

Winners and nominees

The Best FIFA Men's Player

Ten players were shortlisted on 24 July 2018. The 3 finalists were revealed on 3 September 2018.

Luka Modrić won the award with over 29% of the vote.

The selection criteria for the men's players of the year was: respective achievements during the period from 3 July 2017 to 15 July 2018.

Selection panel

  Sami Al-Jaber
  Emmanuel Amuneke
  Cha Bum-kun
  Fabio Capello
  Didier Drogba
  Kaká
  Frank Lampard
  Lothar Matthäus
  Alessandro Nesta
  Carlos Alberto Parreira
  Ronaldo
  Andy Roxburgh
  Wynton Rufer

The Best FIFA Goalkeeper

The three finalists were announced on 3 September 2018.

Selection panel

 Alessandro Altobelli
 Vítor Baía
 Gordon Banks
 Jorge Campos
 Rinat Dasaev
 Diego Forlán
 René Higuita
 Frédéric Kanouté
 Peter Schmeichel
 Mark Schwarzer

The Best FIFA Men's Coach

Eleven coaches were initially shortlisted on 24 July 2018.

The three finalists were revealed on 3 September 2018.

Didier Deschamps won the award with over 30% of the votes.

Selection panel

  Sami Al-Jaber
  Emmanuel Amuneke
  Cha Bum-kun
  Fabio Capello
  Didier Drogba
  Kaká
  Frank Lampard
  Lothar Matthäus
  Alessandro Nesta
  Carlos Alberto Parreira
  Ronaldo
  Andy Roxburgh
  Wynton Rufer

The Best FIFA Women's Player

Ten players were shortlisted on 3 September 2018.

The three finalists were announced on 3 September 2018.

Marta won the award with nearly 15% of the vote.

Selection panel

  Diego Guacci
  Mia Hamm
  Maia Jackman
  Patrick Jacquemet
  Nadine Keßler
  Andrea Rodebaugh
  Jacqui Shipanga
  Anna Signeul
  Sissi
  Clémentine Touré
  Sun Wen
  Belinda Wilson

The Best FIFA Women's Coach

Ten coaches were shortlisted.

The three finalists were announced on 3 September 2018.

Reynald Pedros won the award with over 23% of the vote.

Selection panel

  Diego Guacci
  Mia Hamm
  Maia Jackman
  Patrick Jacquemet
  Nadine Kessler
  Andrea Rodebaugh
  Jacqui Shipanga
  Anna Signeul
  Sissi
  Clémentine Touré
  Sun Wen
  Belinda Wilson

FIFA Fair Play Award

FIFA Puskás Award

Mohamed Salah won the award with 38% of the vote. Pablo Aimar, Iker Casillas, Miroslav Klose, Alex Scott, Aline Pellegrino, David Trezeguet and Marco van Basten formed the selection panel that named and announced the shortlist of nominees on 3 September 2018. Every registered FIFA.com user was allowed to participate in the final vote, with the questionnaire being presented on the official website of FIFA.

FIFA Fan Award

The award celebrates the best fan moment of September 2017 to July 2018, regardless of championship, gender or nationality.

The three nominees were announced on 3 September 2018.

Peru fans won the award with 74% of the vote.

Selection panel

 Cafu
 Christian Karembeu
 Bora Milutinović
 Lucas Radebe
 Christie Rampone
 Homare Sawa
 Lindsay Tarpley-Snow

FIFA FIFPro World11

The 55-player men's shortlist was announced on 10 September 2018.

The players chosen were David de Gea as goalkeeper, Dani Alves, Raphaël Varane, Sergio Ramos and Marcelo as defenders, Luka Modrić, N'Golo Kanté and Eden Hazard as midfielders, and Kylian Mbappé, Lionel Messi and Cristiano Ronaldo as forwards.

 Second Team

 Third Team

 Fourth Team

 Fifth Team

References

External links
 Official website

2018
2018 in association football
2018 sports awards
2018 in English sport
Football in London
2018 sports events in London
Women's association football trophies and awards
2018 in women's association football